Konstantin Kravchuk was the defending champion but lost in the first round to Kwon Soon-woo.

Vasek Pospisil won the title after defeating Go Soeda 6–1, 6–2 in the final.

Seeds

Draw

Finals

Top half

Bottom half

References
Main Draw
Qualifying Draw

Busan Open - Singles
2017 Singles